RTV Vogošća or Televizija Vogošća is a public TV channel founded by Assembly of Vogošća municipality. It was established in 1996  and the program is mainly produced in Bosnian. Headquarters of RTV Vogošća is located in Vogošća near capital city of Bosnia and Herzegovina, Sarajevo. TV shows promote multiculturalism and specific culture, tradition and customs characteristic for the Sarajevo Canton area and whole BiH. This television channel broadcasts a variety of programs such as local news, talk shows, documentaries, local sports, mosaic and children's program.

Radio Vogošća is also part of public municipality services.

References

External links 
 Official website of RTV Vogošća
 Communications Regulatory Agency of Bosnia and Herzegovina
 The best radio

Television channels and stations established in 1997
Television stations in Bosnia and Herzegovina
Mass media in Sarajevo